General Authority for Culture is a Saudi government body responsible for all cultural activities in the Kingdom, it announced its establishment by royal decree on May 7, 2016 and its chairman Ahmed Almazyad 

In April 2018, a new board of directors was formed to supervise and manage the cultural activities in the Kingdom. The board of directors involves three women, two of whom are theater and film directors.

Culture sectors 
The authority developed sectors with aims to support the creativity and talent in the country; these sectors are : 

 Literature.
 Film and Media Content.
 Theatre and Performing Arts.
 Music.
 Visual Arts.

References 

2016 establishments in Saudi Arabia
Government agencies established in 2016
